The beheading of Bhausaheb Maruti Talekar by HuJI islamic terrorist led by Ilyas Kashmiri happened in the Rajouri district Jammu and Kashmir on 27 February 2000. Talekar was an Indian soldier on guard duty at the Ashok Listening Post. All seven soldiers on duty from the 17 Maratha Light Infantry battalion were killed. Talekar was beheaded and his head was carried across the line of control to Pakistan.

Biography of Talekar
Talekar was a resident of Kolgaon village in Ahmednagar district, Maharashtra, India. He was the son of daily laborers and had studied till the tenth grade before joining the army. He was unmarried and 24 years old at the time of his death. According to natives of his village, the family of Talekar did not know that he was beheaded. The army declined Talekar's sister request to see his face. His last rites were performed at his village.

Incident
In the early hours of 27 February 2000, a guerilla attack led by Ilyas Kashmiri and twenty-five HuJI terrorists was launched at the Ashok Lightening Post, Nowshehra sector in the Rajouri district of Jammu and Kashmir, India. The attack was covered by heavy mortar and rocket fire from Pakistani soldiers, which were dressed in black uniform and reported to be from Special Services Group. The Indian post is surrounded on all three sides by the Pakistani posts and is said to be an unfavorable position.  Bhausaheb Maruti Talekar was on guard duty, and other seven soldiers of the 17 Maratha Light Infantry were in the bunker at the time of incident. Ilyas Kashmiri slit Talekar's throat and thereafter other militants accompanying him opened fire inside bunker in which all seven soldiers were killed.

The head of Talekar was taken across the Line of Control in Pakistan by the militants and was brandished as a trophy before the public. According to Indian Army, Talekar was the first casualty of the attack. A captured militant revealed that they had played football with the head of Talekar.

Pakistan denied that its soldiers were involved in the incident.

Aftermath

Ilyas Kashmiri

Pakistani media published the photographs of Ilyas Kasmiri carrying the severed head of Talekar. It also reported that the then president of Pakistan Gen. Pervez Musharraf honored Ilyas Kashmiri in a ceremony and rewarded his one-lakh ruppes cash for bringing the head of an Indian soldier. Ilyas Kashmiri, was killed in a US drone attack in 2011.

The inquiry against the commanding officer
The commanding officer of the unit was Colonel Sandes. He had communicated to the superiors seeking permission to shift the Ashok listening post because of the possibility of a sneaking attack such as the one which happened on the 27 February 2000, but he was denied permission. He faced a court of inquiry after the incident which exonerated him, but his superiors had reported that colonel Sandes was unfit for commanding a unit. The colonel had to fight a legal battle to be eligible for promotion. Sandes was promoted to the rank of Brigadier in 2010.

Talekar's memory
The army took up the responsibility of the education of his sister after the incident. His family continues to receive a pension of 10,000 per month. A sum of 12 lakh rupees was given to Talekar's family as compensation.

In his memory, a community hall was built in his village. His sister is pursuing the hope to start a school for special children in his memory.

Similar incidents
During the Kargil War, Captain Saurabh Kalia of the Indian Army was captured by the Pakistani soldiers and later his dead body was handed back. Indian security officials allege that Saurabh Kalia's dead body was badly mutilated when they received it. In one decade before 2013, when Lance Naik Hemraj was beheaded, there have been at least three other such instances of decapitation of Indian soldiers by the Pakistani troops.

According to Indian newspaper, The Hindu, cross-border raids had almost ceased after 2003. However, they resumed again in 2007 and 2008. In 2017, India alleged that two of its soldiers were beheaded by Pakistani Border Action Team (BAT). After killing and beheading the two soldiers, Border Action Team retreated back to Pakistan without suffering any losses.

See also
Saurabh Kalia
List of punitive expeditions across the LOC

References

Terrorist incidents in India in 2000
Murder in India
India–Pakistan relations
2000 in India
Talekar, Bhausaheb Maruti
Talekar, Bhausaheb Maruti
Islamism-related beheadings